Alberto Ortiz (born 14 May 1923) is a Uruguayan modern pentathlete. He competed at the 1948 and 1952 Summer Olympics.

References

External links
 

1923 births
Possibly living people
Sportspeople from Montevideo
Uruguayan male modern pentathletes
Olympic modern pentathletes of Uruguay
Modern pentathletes at the 1948 Summer Olympics
Modern pentathletes at the 1952 Summer Olympics